The 1948 Delaware gubernatorial election was held on November 2, 1948.

Incumbent Republican Governor Walter W. Bacon was term-limited, having served two consecutive terms.

Democratic nominee Elbert N. Carvel defeated Republican nominee Hyland P. George with 53.69% of the vote.

Nominations
Nominations were made by party conventions.

Democratic nomination
The Democratic convention was held on August 24 at Dover.

Candidate
Elbert N. Carvel, incumbent Lieutenant Governor, nominated unanimously

Republican nomination
The Republican convention was held on August 11 at Dover.

Candidate
Hyland P. George, road building contractor, nominated by acclamation

Withdrew
John S. Isaacs

General election

Results

References

Bibliography
 
 

1948
Delaware
Gubernatorial
Delaware gubernatorial election